Municipal election for Lalitpur, the third largest city in Nepal, was held on May 14, 2017 for the post of Mayor, Deputy Mayor, Ward Chairmen and Ward Members. All posts were elected by First past the post method; with all having a tenure of 5 years.

Background
Elections were last held in 2006 and since then the city has been without an elected executive. With the passing of a new constitution, a commission was formed to restructure the existing local levels into more powerful and autonomous local bodies. With the addition of Wards 1 to 13 of Karyabinayak municipality, the city was upgraded from sub-metropolitan to metropolitan city with 29 wards. Electors in each ward will elect a ward chairman and 4 ward members. Out of 4 ward members, 2 must be female and one of the 2 females must belong to the Dalit community.

Results

|-
! colspan="2" style="text-align:left;" | Party
! style="width: 108pt;" |Candidate
! style="width: 40pt;" |Votes
! style="width: 30pt;" | %
|-
| style="background-color:;" |
| style="text-align:left;" |Nepali Congress
| style="text-align:left;" | Chiri Babu Maharjan
| 24,642
| 27.62
|-
| style="background-color:;" |
| style="text-align:left;" |CPN (Unified Marxist–Leninist)
| style="text-align:left;" | Hari Krishna Byanjankar
| 24,316
| 27.26
|-
| style="background-color:;" |
| style="text-align:left;" | Independent
| style="text-align:left;" | Ramesh Maharjan
| 13,458
| 15.09
|-
| style="background-color:darkred;" |
| style="text-align:left;" |CPN (Maoist Centre)
| style="text-align:left;" | Dinesh Maharjan
| 10,661
| 11.95
|-
| 
| style="text-align:left;" | Others
| 
| 2,037
| 2.28
|-
|- style="background:#eee"
|colspan=3 align=left|Invalid/blank votes|| 14,100 || 15.80
|- style="background:#eee"
|colspan=3 align=left|Total|| 89,214 || 100
|- style="background:#eee"
| colspan=3 align=left|Registered voters/turnout|| 112,923|| 79.00
|}

|-
! colspan="2" style="text-align:left;" | Party
! style="width: 108pt;" |Candidate
! style="width: 40pt;" |Votes
! style="width: 30pt;" | %
|-
| style="background-color:;" |
| style="text-align:left;" |Nepali Congress
| style="text-align:left;" | Gita Satyal
| 19,819
| 22.22
|-
| style="background-color:;" |
| style="text-align:left;" | Independent
| style="text-align:left;" | Shova Shakya
| 14,240
| 15.96
|-
| style="background-color:darkred;" |
| style="text-align:left;" |CPN (Maoist Centre)
| style="text-align:left;" | Hasina Shakya
| 12,979
| 14.55
|-
| style="background-color:gold;" |
| style="text-align:left;" |Rastriya Prajatantra Party
| style="text-align:left;" | Babu Kaji Pradhan
| 10,540
| 11.81
|-
| style="background-color:crimson;" |
| style="text-align:left;" |Naya Shakti
| style="text-align:left;" | Sajani Maharjan
| 1,380
| 1.55
|-
| 
| style="text-align:left;" | Others
| 
| 860
| 0.96
|-
|- style="background:#eee"
|colspan=3 align=left|Invalid/blank votes|| 29,396 || 32.95
|- style="background:#eee"
|colspan=3 align=left|Total|| 89,214 || 100
|- style="background:#eee"
| colspan=3 align=left|Registered voters/turnout|| 112,923|| 79.00
|}

Ward Results

|-
! colspan="2" style="text-align:left;" | Party
! Chairman
! Members
|-
| style="background-color:;" |
| style="text-align:left;" |CPN (Unified Marxist–Leninist)
| style="text-align:center;" |14
| style="text-align:center;" |62
|-
| style="background-color:;" |
| style="text-align:left;" |Nepali Congress
| style="text-align:center;" |10
| style="text-align:center;" |32
|-
| style="background-color:darkred;" |
| style="text-align:left;" |CPN (Maoist Centre)
| style="text-align:center;" |4
| style="text-align:center;" |10
|-
| style="background-color:;" |
| style="text-align:left;" | Independent
| style="text-align:center;" |1
| style="text-align:center;" |0
|-
| style="background-color:crimson;" |
| style="text-align:left;" | Naya Shakti
| style="text-align:center;" |0
| style="text-align:center;" |1
|-
! colspan="2" style="text-align:right;" | Total
! 29
! 105
|}

4 candidates (3 from CPN-UML and 1 from Naya Shakti) for Ward Members were elected unopposed under Dalit woman reserved seats. 11 ward member seats reserved for Dalit women were left unfilled due to lack of candidates.

References

2017
2017 elections in Nepal